This is a list of the songs that topped the Global Chinese Pop Chart in 2018.

The Global Chinese Pop Chart (全球华语歌曲排行榜) is a weekly Chinese language pop music chart compiled by 7 Chinese language radio stations across Asia: Beijing Music Radio, Shanghai Eastern Broadcasting (zh), Radio Guangdong, Radio Television Hong Kong, Taipei Pop Radio, Singapore's Y.E.S. 93.3FM and Malaysia's 988 FM. The chart's definition of "Chinese language" covers all three main genres of C-pop: Mandopop, Cantopop and Hokkien pop.

Chart history

References

Global Pop 2018
Number-one songs
China pop